Richard Frederick Offer (1909 – 6 February 2007) was an English rower who won Silver Goblets at Henley Royal Regatta and a silver medal at the 1938 British Empire Games.

Offer was born at Hampton Wick, the son of Henry John Offer and his wife Vera Jenny Burgoine. His maternal
grandfather, Alfred Burgoine, was a boat designer who built one of Queen Victoria's Royal Barges and a motor launch that held the world water speed record. He was educated at Tiffin School where he began rowing. He joined Kingston Rowing Club in 1929, where his brothers Tom and Jack Offer were already members.

Offer excelled at rowing, in particular partnering his brother Jack in the pairs. They also took part in skiffing, being members of The Skiff Club. They won the Gentlemen's Double Sculls at the Skiff Championships Regatta in 1930, 1931, 1932, 1933 and 1935. In 1936 the pair won Silver Goblets at Henley Royal Regatta. Two years later they were selected to compete in the 1938 British Empire Games. Offer worked in an insurance company in the City of London and had to take unpaid leave to be able to compete.  In spite of the difficulties in maintaining training during the six-week sea voyage to Australia they won the silver medal in the double sculls event.

Offer was also a sailor with a boat on the south coast, and later at the Thames Sailing Club at Surbiton where he owned a Thames Rater which was designed and built by his grandfather.  He also played rugby for the Old Tiffinians and at County level in the winter months.

At the start of World War II, Offer was a volunteer fire-watcher on the River Thames until he gained his Commission in the Royal Navy and was employed on convoy escorts. At the D-Day Normandy landings he was a commander of tank landing craft LCT708, and lead the landings on Gold Beach.

After the war, Offer returned to rowing at Kingston RC, where he competed until the 1950s. He then began coaching at Kingston and at Tiffin School, where he inspired successes in regattas including Henley and coached future international rowers. He played a major part in developing Kingston RC's headquarters at Canbury Gardens, Kingston and helped in the running of Kingston Regatta. He became president of Kingston Rowing Club in 1993.

References

1909 births
2007 deaths
People educated at Tiffin School
English male rowers
Royal Navy officers
Rowers at the 1938 British Empire Games
Commonwealth Games gold medallists for England
Commonwealth Games silver medallists for England
Commonwealth Games medallists in rowing
Medallists at the 1938 British Empire Games